Bonnesen is a surname. Notable people with the surname include:

Beatrice Bonnesen (1906–1979), Danish film actress
Carl Johan Bonnesen (1868–1933), Danish sculptor
Erling Bonnesen, Danish politician
Tommy Bonnesen (1873–1935), Danish mathematician

See also
Bonnesen's inequality, geometric term